A One Day International (ODI) is an international cricket match between two teams, each having ODI status, as determined by the International Cricket Council. The women's variant of the game is similar to the men's version, with minor modifications to umpiring and pitch requirements. The first women's ODI was played in 1973, between England and Australia. The Denmark women's national cricket team played their first ODI during the 1989 Women's European Cricket Cup, when they faced Ireland in the opening round of the tournament in Nykøbing Mors. They competed in two Women's Cricket World Cup; in 1993 and 1997, but lost their status as an ODI-playing nation after the 1999 Women's European Cricket Championship.

In total, Denmark have played 33 ODIs. Two players; Janni Jønsson and Susanne Nielsen are the most capped players, each appearing in all but one of Denmark's matches. Jønsson is also the team's leading run-scorer with 388 runs, and wicket-taker with 35 wickets. Her total of 53 against Ireland in 1995 is the highest score in women ODI cricket by a Danish player.

Key

List of players
Statistics are correct as on 21 July 1999, the date of Denmark's last women's ODI (Denmark Women are not currently active in Women's One Day International cricket). This list includes all players who have played at least one ODI match and is initially arranged in the order of debut appearance. Where more than one player won their first cap in the same match, those players are initially listed alphabetically.

References

 
Lists of One Day International cricketers
Women's cricket-related lists